Stenophantes longipes is a species of beetle in the family Cerambycidae. It was described by Hermann Burmeister in 1861.

References

Cerambycinae
Beetles described in 1861